Denis Dmitriyevich Cheryshev (born 26 December 1990) is a Russian professional footballer who plays as a left winger for  club Venezia and the Russia national team.

A youth product of Real Madrid, he made his debut for the reserves in 2009 and with the first team in 2012. He then had loan spells at Sevilla, Villarreal and Valencia before joining Villarreal permanently in 2016, and returned to Valencia on loan two years later. In June 2019, he signed permanently for the latter.

Having earned 45 caps and scored 23 goals in its youth categories, Cheryshev made his debut for Russia in 2012. He was a participant at the 2018 World Cup, scoring four goals as the team reached the quarter-finals, and Euro 2020.

Club career

Early years
Born in Nizhny Novgorod, Russian Soviet Federative Socialist Republic, Soviet Union, Cheryshev started his career at Sporting de Gijón, where his father Dmitri was playing at the time. He soon followed him to his next club, Burgos CF, entering locals CD Burgos Promesas 2000 at the age of 9.

During his spell, Cheryshev was selected to play for the youth levels of the Castile and León regional team.

Real Madrid
Cheryshev joined Real Madrid in 2002, and completed his formative years in their academy. Still a junior, he appeared in nine Segunda División games with Real Madrid Castilla during the 2008–09 season; it was also during this time he formed a long-lasting friendship with future Spanish national team player Nacho.

Over the next two years, Cheryshev played 61 matches and scored 11 goals for the reserve side. He was an important attacking unit as the latter campaign ended in promotion to Segunda División, after a five-year absence.

Cheryshev made his debut in division two on 17 August 2012, playing the full 90 minutes in a 1–2 away loss against Villarreal CF. On 27 November, he played his official game with the first team, in a 3–0 home win (7–1 on aggregate) over CD Alcoyano in the round of 32 of the Copa del Rey.

In September 2013, Cheryshev was loaned to fellow league club Sevilla FC for the remainder of the campaign with the possibility of a permanent deal. As a result of persistent injury concerns, he made only four league appearances and the Andalusians opted not to exercise the option, with the player joining Villarreal on loan for 2014–15 instead.

Cheryshev scored on his debut for Villarreal on 24 August 2014, netting the second goal in a 2–0 win at Levante UD. Having recovered from the injuries which plighted his time at his previous team, he thrived at El Madrigal and netted seven times from 40 appearances in all competitions.

Returned to the Santiago Bernabéu Stadium, Cheryshev made top flight debut for Real Madrid on 19 September 2015, playing 13 minutes in a 1–0 defeat of Granada CF. He scored his first competitive goal for them on 2 December, featuring 45 minutes in a 3–1 away victory over Cádiz CF in the Spanish Cup's round of 32. However, his appearance in the match drew controversy as he was ineligible for selection after having collected three yellow cards in the previous edition of the tournament, and resulted in Real Madrid being expelled from the tournament. President Florentino Pérez claimed that the Royal Spanish Football Federation had not informed the club that the player was suspended and challenged the action taken against the team, though he was unsuccessful.

On 1 February 2016, Cheryshev was loaned to Valencia CF until June. He made his debut two days later, coming on as a second-half substitute in 7–0 away loss against FC Barcelona in the semi-finals of the domestic cup. He scored his first and only goal on 13 February, when he headed home in a 2–1 win over RCD Espanyol at the Mestalla Stadium.

Villarreal
On 15 June 2016, Cheryshev returned to Villarreal on a permanent deal where he signed a contract until 2021. On 14 August 2018 he returned to Valencia on loan, scoring twice during the season to help to a fourth-place finish.

Valencia
Cheryshev joined Valencia permanently on 29 June 2019, for a fee of €6 million. Three years later, following a spell marred by injury problems, he left after his contract expired.

Venezia
On 31 August 2022, Cheryshev signed a two-year deal with Venezia F.C. with the option for an additional season. He scored twice in his third Serie B appearance, a 4–1 away win against Cagliari Calcio on 1 October.

International career

Prior to making his international debut with Russia, Cheryshev was also eligible to represent Spain as he held dual nationality. In a 2011 interview with Marca he indicated that he felt more Spanish than Russian, but accepted a call up to the Russian team in November 2012. He made his debut eight days later in a 2–2 friendly draw with the United States, the same opposition his father Dmitri had played against 20 years earlier.

Cheryshev played his first competitive game on 14 August 2013, when he came on as a half-time substitute in a 2014 FIFA World Cup qualifier against Northern Ireland in Belfast; after just five minutes on the pitch, he had to be stretchered off in an eventual 1–0 loss. He was called up to a provisional 25-man squad for the finals on 16 May 2014, being the only player present not playing his club football in Russia. He was, however, left out of Fabio Capello's final list and also later missed the UEFA Euro 2016 tournament due to injury.

After an absence of more than two years, Cheryshev appeared for the national team again on 27 March 2018 in a friendly with France. On 11 May, he was included in an extended squad for that year's World Cup, also being named as one of the final 23 players. He made his debut in the competition on 14 June, replacing the injured Alan Dzagoev midway through the first half of the group stage opener against Saudi Arabia in Moscow and scoring twice in a 5–0 win. He scored his third goal in the tournament against Egypt in a 3–1 victory, adding another in the quarter-finals when he curled a strike past Croatia's Danijel Subašić from just outside the 18-yard area to open the scoring, but in an eventual 4–3 penalty shoot-out loss.

Cheryshev made a preliminary 30-man squad for Euro 2020 in May 2021. On 2 June, he was included in the final squad. He came on for Daler Kuzyayev after the latter was stretchered off in the first group game against Belgium, spending 33 minutes on the field before being himself replaced in a 3–0 defeat; according to manager Stanislav Cherchesov, he was substituted because he "did not fit into the game". He did not take the field in the following two matches, with the country being eliminated in the group stage.

Career statistics

Club

International

Scores and results list Russia's goal tally first, score column indicates score after each Cheryshev goal.

Honours
Real Madrid Castilla
Segunda División B: 2011–12

Sevilla
UEFA Europa League: 2013–14

Valencia
Copa del Rey: 2018–19

Individual
FIFA World Cup Fantasy Team: 2018

References

External links

1990 births
Living people
Russian Orthodox Christians from Russia
Eastern Orthodox Christians from Spain
Russian emigrants to Spain
Naturalised citizens of Spain
Sportspeople from Nizhny Novgorod
Russian footballers
Spanish footballers
Association football wingers
La Liga players
Segunda División players
Segunda División B players
Real Madrid Castilla footballers
Real Madrid CF players
Sevilla FC players
Villarreal CF players
Valencia CF players
Serie B players
Venezia F.C. players
Russia youth international footballers
Russia under-21 international footballers
Russia international footballers
2018 FIFA World Cup players
UEFA Euro 2020 players
Russian expatriate footballers
Spanish expatriate footballers
Expatriate footballers in Italy
Russian expatriate sportspeople in Italy
Spanish expatriate sportspeople in Italy